Events from the year 1729 in Ireland.

Incumbent
Monarch: George II

Events
February 3 – the foundation stone is laid for the new Irish Houses of Parliament on College Green in Dublin, designed by Edward Lovett Pearce MP as the world's first purpose-built bicameral legislative building. 
Completion of Castletown House, Celbridge, County Kildare, Ireland's first Palladian mansion, designed by Alessandro Galilei and Edward Lovett Pearce for William Conolly, Speaker of the Irish House of Commons.

Arts and literature
Jonathan Swift publishes A Modest Proposal.

Births

January 12 – Edmund Burke, statesman (d. 1797)
September 21 – Philip Embury, Methodist (d. 1775)
November 10 – Martin Glynn, Catholic priest (executed 1794)
December 8 – James Bernard, politician (d. 1790).
Hercules Langrishe, politician (d. 1811)
Henry Mossop, actor (d. 1773?)
Arthur O'Leary, Franciscan (d. 1802)

Deaths

March 30 – Jonathan Smedley, Dean of Clogher and Whig satirist (b. 1671)
May 8 – William King, Church of Ireland Archbishop of Dublin and author (b. 1650)
September 1 – Richard Steele, writer and politician, co-founder of The Spectator magazine (b. 1672)
Full date unknown
Sir Edward Crofton, 2nd Baronet, of The Mote, landowner and politician (b. c. 1662)
Aogán Ó Rathaille, Irish language poet (b. c. 1675)

References

 
Years of the 18th century in Ireland
Ireland
1720s in Ireland